Events from the year 1659 in Sweden

Incumbents
 Monarch – Charles X Gustav

Events

 Swedish occupation of Chojnice.
 Failed Swedish attempt to storm Copenhagen. 
 Swedish occupation of Langeland.
 Battle of Femerbält.
 Swedish occupation of Falster, Lolland and Nakskov.
 Swedish occupation of Fredericia.
 Swedish occupation of Møn.
 Battle of Ebeltoft
 End of the Swedish occupation of Courland. 
 Battle of Nyborg.

Births

 29 April - Sophia Elisabet Brenner, writer   (died 1730) 
 Michael Dahl, painter   (died 1743) 
 Adam Ludwig Lewenhaupt, general   (died 1719)

Deaths

References

 
Years of the 17th century in Sweden
Sweden